Nation Ford Fish Weir is a historic fishing weir located near Rock Hill, South Carolina.  It is one of the few relatively intact Native American fish weirs remaining in South Carolina. It is a double "V"-shaped rock fish trap or weir located in the channel of the Catawba River upstream from the railroad trestle at Nation Ford. The weir is located near the Nation Ford Road crossing point of the river and to several documented Catawba people villages.

It was listed on the National Register of Historic Places in 2007.

References

Archaeological sites on the National Register of Historic Places in South Carolina
Buildings and structures in Rock Hill, South Carolina
National Register of Historic Places in Rock Hill, South Carolina
Weirs